The "crown" of Queen Ranavalona III is a crowning of a royal canopy used by Ranavalona III (November 22, 1861 - May 23, 1917) during the ceremony of declaration of war against France in 1895.

Although it is not precisely a crown, but a golden zinc top ornament for a ceremony canopy, it is usually called "crown of the Queen Ranavalona III", by confusion with the crown of the Queen Ranavalona I, actually worn by the queen Ranavalona III during her coronation. This crown was stolen in 2011 in the Andiafiavaratra Palace (Antananarivo) and has still not been recovered.

Location 
This crown of royal canopy is permanently exhibited in Paris, France at the Museum of the Army, which is housed within the French Hôtel National des Invalides National Palace. Les Invalides was built in the XVIIth century (1671-1676) and is located in the 7th arrondissement of Paris, 400 meters from the Military Academy. Originally a royal residence for French soldiers and disabled, elderly or retired former soldiers, the building now houses several museums and religious facilities as well as different services and agencies for former combatants. The object was donated to the Museum by Georges Richard, former mayor of Saint-Denis, Réunion between 1893 and 1896.

See also 
 Les Invalides
 Ranavalona III
 Merina Kingdom
 Madagascar
 Crown jewels

References 

 historical information on the website of the Consulate of Madagascar in Barcelona
 the Army Museum in Paris. 

Ranavalona III
Madagascar
Malagasy monarchy